William Shenners Jr. was a member of the Wisconsin State Senate.

Biography
Shenners was born on July 21, 1902 in Milwaukee, Wisconsin. He would become involved in real estate and insurance.

Political career
Shenners was a member of the Senate from the 8th district from 1933 to 1936. He was a Democrat.

References

Politicians from Milwaukee
Businesspeople from Milwaukee
Democratic Party Wisconsin state senators
1902 births
Year of death missing